Amir Soltan Ahmadi is an Iranian actor and comedian who is one of Iran's foremost puppeteers. He is known for playing Pesar Ammeh Za on Kolah Ghermezi.

Filmography

TV series
 Kolah Ghermezi - Writer, performer of Pesar Ammeh Za
 Oobi: Dasdasi - Director and performer
 Shutters - Main cast

Film
 Kolah Ghermezi and Pesar Khaleh - Performer of Pesar Ammeh Za
 The Castle (post-production, 2018) - Voice actor, main cast

Theatre
Bahman Koochik and Little Bahman - Main cast

See also
Iraj Tahmasb
Hamid Jebelli

References

External links

University of Tehran alumni
Living people
Iranian male actors
Year of birth missing (living people)